Adolf Antrich (born 8 December 1940) is an Austrian former footballer. He played in two matches for the Austria national football team in 1971.

Antrich played five seasons of club football for Kapfenberger SV before joining SK Rapid Wien late in his career, where he would win the 1971–72 Austrian Cup. While playing for Rapid, Antrich had a streak of 784 minutes without conceding a goal, the seventh longest in the history of the Austrian Bundesliga as of August 2012.

References

External links 
 

1940 births
Living people
People from Leoben
Footballers from Styria
Austrian footballers
Austria international footballers
Austrian Football Bundesliga players
Kapfenberger SV players
SK Rapid Wien players
FC Red Bull Salzburg players
Association football goalkeepers
SW Bregenz players
FC Kärnten players
DSV Leoben players